The Franklin County Courthouse is a historic building in Winchester, Tennessee, U.S. It is the courthouse of Franklin County, Tennessee.

The building was the third courthouse built for Franklin County. The first one was built in 1814 and the second one in 1839. The third and current courthouse was built in 1936–1937. It was built with funding from the Public Works Administration.

The building was designed in the PWA Moderne architectural style by Marr & Holman. It has been listed on the National Register of Historic Places since March 30, 1995.

References

National Register of Historic Places in Franklin County, Tennessee
Courthouses on the National Register of Historic Places in Tennessee
County courthouses in Tennessee
Government buildings completed in 1937
1937 establishments in Tennessee
PWA Moderne architecture
Winchester, Tennessee